John Donahoo (sometimes spelled Donahoe) (1786–1858) was a lighthouse builder active in Maryland for much of the first half of the nineteenth century.

Biography
Little is known of Donahoo's life, but he appears to have been an active citizen in Havre de Grace, Maryland, for much of his career; he was an election judge and town commissioner, and served on the school board. He was also an active businessman, with concerns in fishing and real estate. As a builder, Donahoo attracted the attention of Stephen Pleasonton, Fifth Auditor of the United States Treasury and overseer of lighthouse construction for the government; Donahoo's prices were low and the quality of his work was good. Consequently, he was awarded the contracts for a dozen lighthouses in Maryland and Virginia. Seven of these still stand:

 Pooles Island Light (1825)
 Concord Point Light (1827)
 Cove Point Light (1828)
 Point Lookout Light (1830)
 Turkey Point Light (1833)
 Piney Point Light (1836)
 Fishing Battery Light (1853)

He also constructed the following lighthouses:

Thomas Point Light (1825, replaced by a second stone tower in 1838)
Fog Point Light (1827, superseded by the Solomons Lump Light in 1875)
Lazaretto Point Light (1831, demolished in 1926; replica built on original site in 1985)
Clay Island Light (1832, collapsed in 1894 after deactivation)
Watts Island Light (1833, destroyed in a storm in 1944) – this was his only light built outside of Maryland
Blakistone Island Light (1851, destroyed by fire in 1956)

Donahoo died in 1858, and was buried in Havre de Grace's Angel Hill Cemetery.

References

1786 births
1858 deaths
Lighthouse builders
People from Havre de Grace, Maryland
Architects from Maryland
19th-century American architects
School board members in Maryland
19th-century American politicians